Gaspare Grasselini (Palermo, January 19, 1796 - Frascati, September 16, 1875) was an Italian Cardinal who was Cardinal Deacon of Santi Vito, Modesto e Crescenzio from 1856 to 1867.

References
Catholic Hierarchy

18th-century Italian cardinals
Cardinals created by Pope Pius IX
1796 births
1875 deaths
Clergy from Palermo